Echinocereus triglochidiatus is a species of hedgehog cactus known by several common names, including kingcup cactus, claretcup, and Mojave mound cactus. This cactus is native to the southwestern United States and northern Mexico, where it is a resident of varied habitats from low desert to rocky slopes, scrub, and mountain woodland. It is most abundant in shady areas. 

A number of varieties of this highly variable cactus species are known, but not all are universally recognized. In general, it is a mounding cactus, forming bulbous piles of a few to hundreds of spherical to cylindrical stems. It is densely spiny and somewhat woolly. The showy flower is a funnel-shaped bloom up to 8-9 cm wide and bright scarlet red to orange-red tepals. A thick nectar chamber and many thready pink stamens are at the center of the corolla. The flowers are pollinated by hummingbirds.

One variety, E. t. arizonicus, is federally listed as an endangered species in the United States. It is limited to the intersection of Arizona and New Mexico in the United States with Mexico. This variety is sometimes included within Echinocereus coccineus.

The conservation status of several subspecies differs from that displayed. Examples include:
 E. t. var. arizonicus 	Arizona hedgehog cactus		(endangered)
 E. t. var. melanacanthus	black-spine claret-cup hedgehog	(salvage restricted)
 E. t. var. neomexicanus	Mexican claret-cup hedgehog	(salvage restricted)

 E. triglochidiatus is the official state cactus of Colorado.

Etymology
Presumably, the specific epithet comes from tri- and glochidium, with a meaning of  "having three arrow points".

References

External links
Jepson Manual Treatment
USDA Plants Profile
Flora of North America Profile
Ecology
Photo gallery

triglochidiatus
Cacti of Mexico
Cacti of the United States
Flora of the California desert regions
Flora of the Chihuahuan Desert
Flora of the Sonoran Deserts
Flora of New Mexico
Flora of Arizona
Flora of Colorado
Flora of Northwestern Mexico
Natural history of the Lower Colorado River Valley
Natural history of the Mojave Desert
North American desert flora